South Ward School may refer to:

 South Ward School (Clearwater, Florida), listed on the National Register of Historic Places (NRHP)
 South Ward School (Cresco, Iowa), listed on the NRHP
 South Ward School (Bellefonte, Pennsylvania), listed on the NRHP

See also
Ward School (disambiguation)